St Denis' Church, East Hatley is a deconsecrated church in East Hatley in Cambridgeshire, England. It is a listed building, Grade 2*, and the building and its churchyard (which is still consecrated) are a 200 square metre Local Nature Reserve. It is owned and managed by the Friends of Friendless Churches.

History 
The church dates to the early thirteenth century and was restored by William Butterfield in 1874. It was last used for worship in 1959, and in 1985 it was deconsecrated and transferred to South Cambridgeshire District Council. By 2003 its condition had severely deteriorated, and as it is a listed building the council agreed to pay for its restoration. On 30 November 2016 ownership was transferred to the Friends of Friendless Churches.

The churchyard is mainly neutral grassland, but some is calcareous, and its grasses and flowers are diverse. Flowers include hoary plantain, rough hawkbit and oxlip.

Access is via a footpath from the road called East Hatley in the village of East Hatley.

References

Local Nature Reserves in Cambridgeshire
Churches preserved by the Friends of Friendless Churches
Churchyards in England
Scheduled monuments in Cambridgeshire